Denmans Crossroads is a ghost town in Licking County, in the U.S. state of Ohio.

History
The community was named for the local Denman family. Phillip Denman built the first house in the area in 1813.

References

Geography of Licking County, Ohio
1813 establishments in Ohio
Populated places established in 1813